Azizlu may refer to:
 Azizlu, Armenia
 Azizlu, Ardabil, Iran
 Azizlu, East Azerbaijan, Iran
 Azizlu, Zanjan, Iran